Walther Bringolf (1 August 1895 – 24 March 1981) was a former President of the National Council of Switzerland (1961/1962). He was a member of the Social Democratic Party of Switzerland and was a long-time mayor of Schaffhausen (1933–1968).

Communist activities

Bringolf sympathised with the Russian Revolution and attended the Second Congress of the Third International. Whilst there he attended the Kultintern conference and joined their Provisional International Bureau.

References

External links

Social Democratic Party of Switzerland politicians
Mayors of places in Switzerland
People from Schaffhausen
1895 births
1981 deaths
Members of the National Council (Switzerland)
Presidents of the National Council (Switzerland)